The Elmer Holmes Bobst Library, often referred to simply as Bobst Library or just Bobst, is the main library at New York University (NYU) in Lower Manhattan, New York City. The library is located at 70 Washington Square South between LaGuardia Place and the Schwartz pedestrian plaza, across from the southeast corner of Washington Square Park and next to Gould Plaza.

Opened on September 12, 1973, Bobst Library is named after its benefactor, Elmer Holmes Bobst, who gave  toward its completion. Bobst – a philanthropist who made his money in the pharmaceutical industry, and a confidant of U.S. President Richard Nixon – was a long-time trustee at New York University.

Description

The library, built in 1972, is NYU's largest library and one of the largest academic libraries in the U.S. Designed by Philip Johnson and Richard Foster, the 12-story,  structure is the flagship of an eleven-library, 5.9 million-volume system.

Before its construction, the library was the subject of community protests led by Greenwich Village activists Jane Jacobs, Ruth Wittenberg, and Verna Small. Those opposed to the library project claimed it was too big for its building site, and that the tall building would cast a large shadow over neighboring Washington Square Park, obstructing sunlight from public spaces.

The library houses more than 3.3 million volumes, 20,000 journals, and over 3.5 million microforms; and provides access to thousands of electronic resources in the forms of licensed databases, e-journals, and other formats both on-site and to the university community around the world via the Internet. The library is visited by more than 6,500 users per day, and circulates almost one million books annually.

Gifts from Mamdouha S. Bobst and Kevin Brine made possible a significant renovation of Bobst Library's Mezzanine, First Floor and two Lower Levels which was completed in 2005. The library provided text computer terminals for catalog search in the library until the terminals were replaced by PCs with Internet access in 2008.

The library houses several distinct special collections departments, including the Fales Library, the Tamiment Library and Robert F. Wagner Archives, and the University Archives of NYU. On the north side, on even floors, are large, double-height study rooms featuring floor-to-ceiling windows overlooking Washington Square Park.

Notable events

Suicides
In late 2003, the library was the site of two suicides. In separate incidents, students jumped from the open-air crosswalks inside the library and fell to the stereogram-patterned marble floor below.

After the second suicide, the university installed Plexiglas barricades on each level and along the stairways to prevent further jumping. In 2009, a third student jumped to his death from the tenth floor, apparently scaling the plexiglas barricade.

The library has since added floor-to-ceiling metal barriers to prevent any future suicide attempts. The barrier is made of randomly perforated aluminum screens that evoke the zeros and ones of a digital waterfall.

Bobst Boy

Also in 2003, the library was in the news when a homeless student took up permanent residence at the library because he could not afford student housing.  This student received the nickname Bobst Boy and was profiled by the Washington Square News, the university's daily student newspaper.  Reaction amongst the student body was mixed.  Some students cited his case as an example of the university's inability to fully meet its students' financial need.

Name
In 2016, several student organizations sent a list of demands to the NYU Board of Trustees. One of these demands called for a name-change due to Elmer Holmes Bobst's alleged history of antisemitism.

References

External links

New York University Libraries website
Avery Fisher Center for Music and Media
Fales Library and Special Collections
The Tamiment Library and Robert F. Wagner Labor Archives
New York University Archives
175 Facts about NYU (Bobst Library)
Bobst Library Podcasts

1973 establishments in New York City
Federal depository libraries
Greenwich Village
Libraries in Manhattan
Bobst Library
Philip Johnson buildings
Library buildings completed in 1973
University and college academic libraries in the United States
Brutalist architecture in New York City